The Loke Viking is an Anchor handling tug scheduled to be completed in May 2010.
She will be the first in a class of four vessels built for Trans Viking.
In June 2010 she will be chartered by Edinburgh-based oil company Cairn Energy UK PLC for four months, starting in June 2010, for drilling operations in Baffin Bay.

References

Tugboats